A maximum break (also known as a maximum, a 147, or orally, a one-four-seven) is the highest possible  in a single  of snooker. A player compiles a maximum break by potting all 15  with 15  for 120 points, followed by all six  for a further 27 points. Compiling a maximum break is regarded as a highly significant achievement in the game of snooker, and may be compared to a nine-dart finish in darts or a 300 game in ten-pin bowling.

Joe Davis made the first officially recognised maximum break in a 1955 exhibition match in London. At the Classic in January 1982, Steve Davis achieved the first recognised maximum in professional competition, which was also the first in a televised match. The following year, Cliff Thorburn became the first player to make a maximum at the World Snooker Championship. As of 2023, Ronnie O'Sullivan holds the record for the most maximum breaks in professional competition, with 15. He also holds the record for the fastest competitive maximum break, at 5 minutes and 8 seconds, which he achieved at the 1997 World Championship.

Maximum breaks have become more frequent in professional snooker. Only eight recognised maximums were achieved in professional competition in the 1980s, but 26 occurred in the 1990s, 35 in the 2000s, and 86 in the 2010s. In the 1980s and 1990s, some players received £147,000 for making a maximum break, but as the frequency of maximums increased, the reward was changed to a rolling prize pot that began at £5,000, leading to discontent among players. For the 2019–20 snooker season, World Snooker Tour chairman Barry Hearn replaced the rolling prize with a conditional £1 million bonus, to be awarded if 20 or more maximum breaks were attained in the season. The 20 maximums were not achieved. Thereafter, players who made a maximum would win or share a tournament's highest break prize, although some events still offer a separate bonus for a 147. The 2022 World Snooker Championship offered a bonus of £40,000 for a maximum break made at the Crucible and £10,000 for a maximum made in the qualifying rounds, in addition to the £15,000 highest break prize.

History
Joe Davis compiled the first officially recognised maximum break on 22 January 1955, in a match against Willie Smith at Leicester Square Hall, London. The Billiards Association and Control Council initially refused to accept the break since the match was not played under their rules. At the time, the professional game used a rule (now standard) whereby after a foul a player could compel the offender to play the next stroke. It was not until a meeting on 20 March 1957 that the break was officially recognised, and Davis was presented with a certificate to commemorate his achievement. The match between Davis and Smith was played as part of a series of events marking the closure of Leicester Square Hall; known as Thurston's Hall until 1947, the venue had hosted many important billiards and snooker matches since its opening in 1901, including twelve World Snooker Championship finals.

John Spencer compiled a maximum break in the 1979 Holsten Lager International. This did not count as an official maximum, however, as the break was made on a non-templated table used during the event. The first official maximum break in professional competition was compiled by Steve Davis in the 1982 Classic at the Queen Elizabeth Hall in Oldham, against John Spencer. This was also the first televised maximum break. Davis won a Lada car (provided by the event's sponsors) for his achievement. The following year, Cliff Thorburn became the first player to make a maximum at the World Championship in the fourth frame of his second round match against Terry Griffiths.

Before the 1994–95 season, the maximum break remained a rare feat, with only 15 official maximums compiled altogether. However, beginning in the 1994–95 season, at least one maximum break has been achieved every season thereafter; the 13 maximums scored in the 2016–17 season is the highest number to date. Mark Selby made the 100th officially recognised maximum break in professional competition on 7 December 2013 in the seventh frame of his semi-final match against Ricky Walden at the UK Championship. , a further 74 maximum breaks have been officially recorded in professional competition. Englishman Ronnie O'Sullivan has compiled 15 official competitive maximum breaks, the most achieved by any professional player. Following him are John Higgins with twelve, Stephen Hendry with eleven, Stuart Bingham with nine, Judd Trump with eight, Shaun Murphy with seven, and Ding Junhui with six. O'Sullivan also holds the record for the fastest competitive maximum break at just over five minutes, which he set at the 1997 World Championship.

At least seven players have missed the final black on a score of 140: Robin Hull, Ken Doherty, Barry Pinches, Mark Selby, Michael White, Thepchaiya Un-Nooh (twice in the 2015–16 season), and Liang Wenbo in a qualifying match at the 2018 World Championship, after he had already made a maximum earlier in the same match. A break greater than 147 has happened only once in professional competition, when Jamie Burnett made a break of 148 at the qualifying stage of the 2004 UK Championship. Jamie Cope compiled a break of 155 points, the highest possible free-ball break, during practice in 2005. Alex Higgins is said to have attained the same feat by some players.

Records

First maximums
The first known maximum break in practice was made by Murt O'Donoghue at Griffith, Australian Capital Territory, Australia, on 26 September 1934. Joe Davis compiled the first official 147 against Willie Smith in an exhibition match on 22 January 1955 at Leicester Square Hall, London. Rex Williams made the first maximum break in a competitive match against Manuel Francisco, Professionals v. Amateurs, on 23 December 1965 in Cape Town.

John Spencer made the first maximum compiled in professional competition on 13 January 1979 at the Holsten Lager Tournament against Cliff Thorburn, but it was not officially ratified due to oversized pockets. The break was not caught on video as the television-crew were away on a tea-break. The first official maximum break in professional competition was made by Steve Davis in the 1982 Lada Classic against Spencer. This was also the first televised 147. Cliff Thorburn became the first player to make a maximum break at the World Snooker Championship, a feat that has since been repeated by Jimmy White, Stephen Hendry (three times), Ronnie O'Sullivan (three times), Mark Williams, Ali Carter, John Higgins and Neil Robertson.

In March 1989, Cliff Thorburn also became the first player to make two competitive maximum breaks. In November 1995 Stephen Hendry became the first player to make two televised maximum breaks. Thai female snooker player Nutcharut Wongharuthai made a 147 break during a practice match in March 2019, which is believed to be the first maximum break achieved by a woman in any match.

Multiple maximums
More than one official maximum break has been compiled in the same event on more than twenty occasions. The 2008 World Snooker Championship was the first event where two maximum breaks were televised. Two maximum breaks were also televised at the 2019 Welsh Open. Three official maximums at the same WPBSA (World Professional Billiards and Snooker Association) event have been achieved twice. This was at the 2012 UK Championship, when Andy Hicks and Jack Lisowski both compiled one each in qualifying and John Higgins compiled one in the televised stages. Similarly, at the 2017 German Masters, Ali Carter and Ross Muir both compiled one each during qualifying and Tom Ford during the televised stages.

Mark Davis became the only player to make two official maximum breaks in professional competition at the same event when he compiled two 147s at the 2017 Championship League. The 2012 FFB Snooker Open, 2017 German Masters and 2018 Paul Hunter Classic are the only WPBSA events where two maximums were made on the same day. Three maximum breaks were compiled on 8 February 1998 during the Buckley's Bitter Challenge, an unofficial event, by Matthew Stevens, Ryan Day and Tony Chappel. There have been at least five non-tournament matches where more than one maximum was compiled. Peter Ebdon compiled two maximum breaks during an 11-frame exhibition match at Eastbourne Police Club on 15 April 1996. In 2003 he also compiled two consecutive maximum breaks against Steve Davis in an exhibition match. In 2009 Jimmy White and Ronnie O'Sullivan compiled consecutive maximum breaks at an exhibition match in Ireland.

The only player known to compile more than two maximum breaks on a single occasion is Adrian Gunnell, who compiled three maximums in four frames at a club in Telford in 2003 while practising against Ian Duffy. John Higgins and Ronnie O'Sullivan are the only players to record maximum breaks in consecutive ranking events. Higgins made one during his defeat by Mark Williams in the LG Cup final, and then one in his second round match at the 2003 British Open. O'Sullivan made one at the Northern Ireland Trophy and another at the UK Championship in 2007.

Final frames and matches
Hendry, Mark Williams, O'Sullivan (on six occasions), Barry Hawkins, Matthew Stevens, Ding Junhui, Andy Hicks, Shaun Murphy, Ryan Day, John Higgins, Mark Davis (on two occasions), Martin Gould, Luca Brecel, Tom Ford (on two occasions) and Marco Fu have all made maximums to win matches. Only seven of these have come in final-frame deciders, however: Hendry's at the 1997 Charity Challenge, O'Sullivan's at the 2007 UK Championship, both of Davis' at the 2017 Championship League, Gould's at the 2018 Championship League, Ford's at the 2019 English Open and Marco's at the 2022 Hong Kong Masters.

Only Hendry, John Higgins, Stuart Bingham, Ronnie O'Sullivan, Shaun Murphy, Neil Robertson and Judd Trump have made maximums in finals of tournaments. Hendry has made three: the first at the 1997 Charity Challenge, the second at the 1999 British Open and the third at the 2001 Malta Grand Prix. Higgins has made two, at the 2003 LG Cup, and the second at the 2012 Shanghai Masters. Bingham at the 2012 Wuxi Classic, O'Sullivan in the final frame of the 2014 Welsh Open, Murphy at the 2014 Ruhr Open, and Robertson at the 2015 UK Championship. Robertson's maximum is the only one to be compiled in the final of a Triple Crown event. Trump made a maximum in the finals of the 2022 Turkish Masters and the 2022 Champion of Champions.

Fastest
O'Sullivan's first 147 break against Mick Price in their second round tie at the 1997 World Snooker Championship set the record for the fastest maximum in the history of the game. Guinness World Records recorded the time of the break at 5 minutes and 20 seconds. An investigation undertaken by Deadspin in 2017, however, revealed that the time recorded by Guinness is incorrect because the timer was started too early on the BBC footage. Breaks are not officially timed in snooker and the official rules of snooker do not specify how they should be timed, instead leaving the timing to the discretion of the broadcaster. The only timing methodology World Snooker sanctions in its events is the one employed in shot clock events where timing for a player's shot begins when the balls have come to rest from his opponent's previous shot. Under this convention the break would have been timed at 5 minutes and 15 seconds. World Snooker has since suggested that a break starts when the player strikes the cueball for the first time in a break which would result in a time of 5 minutes and 8 seconds, and this is the time that World Snooker now officially acknowledges.

Youngest and oldest
Sean Maddocks is recognised by Guinness World Records as the youngest player to have made a maximum break in any recognised competition. Maddocks was 15 years and 90 days old when he achieved the feat at the LiteTask Pro-Am series in Leeds on 9 July 2017. This broke the record previously held by O'Sullivan, who made a maximum at the 1991 English Amateur Championship when he was 15 years and 98 days old. Judd Trump is known to have made a 147 at the Potters Under-16 Tournament in 2004 at the age of 14 years and 206 days; however, this break is not recognised by Guinness World Records. The youngest player to have made a televised maximum is Ding Junhui, who was aged 19 years and 288 days when he achieved a 147 at the 2007 Masters.

The youngest player to have made an officially recognised maximum break in professional competition is Thanawat Thirapongpaiboon, who compiled a 147 at the 2010 Rhein–Main Masters when he was aged 16 years and 312 days. The oldest player to have done so is Mark Williams, who made the third maximum of his career at the 2022 English Open, aged 47 years and 270 days. Aged 56, former professional Darren Morgan made a maximum break against Gareth Edwards in an amateur Seniors event in 2023; this possibly makes him the oldest player to achieve a maximum break in competition.

Prize money
In professional tournaments there was usually a substantial prize awarded to any player achieving a 147 break. For example, Ronnie O'Sullivan's maximum at the 1997 World Championship earned him £165,000. Of this, £147,000 was for making the 147 break and £18,000 was for achieving the highest break of the tournament.

In the 2011–12 season World Snooker introduced a roll-over system for the maximum break prize money, the "rolling 147 prize". A maximum break is worth £5,000 in the televised stages and £500 in qualifying stages of major ranking events. There is a £500 prize in the Players Tour Championship events from the last 128 onwards. If a maximum is not made then the prize rolls over to the next event until somebody wins it.

At the 2016 Welsh Open, Ronnie O'Sullivan defeated Barry Pinches 4–1 in the first round. In the fifth frame of the match, O'Sullivan declined the opportunity to make a maximum break, potting the pink off the penultimate red and completing a break of 146. He stated afterwards that the prize money of £10,000 was not worthy of a 147. World Snooker chairman Barry Hearn called the decision "unacceptable" and "disrespectful". Individual prizes for a maximum break were phased out at the beginning of the 2019–20 snooker season, with a £1 million bonus on offer for the season if 20 or more were made during the season. The prize would be split among all players who had made at least one qualifying break, with each player receiving an equal share for every break made.

Breaks exceeding 147
A break higher than 147 can be achieved when an opponent  before any reds are potted, and leaves the incoming player  on all 15 reds. If the free ball is potted, the referee places this coloured ball back on its original location, de facto creating a setup as if there were 16 reds in total, thus creating a potential maximum break of 155 if a player starts from a free ball position.

In October 2004, during qualifying for the UK Championship, Jamie Burnett became the only player to record a break of more than 147 in tournament play, when he scored 148 against Leo Fernandez. He took the brown as the free ball, then potted the brown again followed by the 15 reds with 12 blacks, two pinks and a blue, then the six colours.

Some breaks exceeding 147 have been reported in non-tournament settings:
 A 151 is reported to have been compiled by Wally West against Butch Rogers in West London's Hounslow Luciana snooker club during a club match in 1976. After Rogers fouled, West took the green as his free ball followed by the brown. He then took 14 reds and blacks and a pink off the last red. He then cleared up to make the 151.
 In April 1988 Steve Duggan made a 148 in a practice frame against Mark Rowing in Doncaster.
 In 1993 Stephen Hendry made a 148 in a practice match against Alfie Burden.
 In 1995 Tony Drago made a 149 in practice against Nick Manning in West Norwood, London, that was recorded by the Guinness Book of Records as the highest in this category.
 In 1997 Eddie Manning achieved a 149 break in a practice match against Kam Pandya at Willie Thorne's Snooker Club in Leicester. He potted brown, brown, 13 blacks, pink and blue.
 In April 2003 Jamie Cope made a 151 break at The Reardon Snooker Club during a practice game with David Fomm-Ward. After a foul by his opponent, Cope was snookered behind the brown ball. He took the brown as the free ball and then potted the blue, 13 reds with blacks and two with pinks, then the six colours.
 In 2005, Jamie Cope made snooker's first highest possible 155 break in a witnessed practice frame.
 In November 2010 Sam Harvey made a 151 break in a practice match against Kyren Wilson at his home club in Bedford. Harvey potted the brown as the free ball and then the black, 12 reds with blacks, two with pinks and one with blue, then the six colours.
 In August 2021, Thepchaiya Un-Nooh made a 155 break in a practice match against Hossein Vafaei. The feat was filmed by a security camera.
 In March 2022, Marco Fu made a 149 break in a practice match against Noppon Saengkham at the Ding Junhui Snooker Academy.

List of official maximum breaks

Statistics
Below is a list of maximum breaks by player, as of 16 February 2023.

Total maximum breaks

Multiple maximum breaks during a tournament

Match-winning maximum breaks
Tournament games are won when one of the players manages to win more than half of the scheduled frames. For example, if a match is scheduled to have a maximum of seven frames, a player wins the game when winning a fourth frame, regardless of how many frames the other player has. The following are maximum breaks played in frames that won the match.

See also

 Nine-dart finish in darts
 Perfect game in bowling
 Perfect game in baseball
 Golden set in tennis

Notes

References

Snooker terminology
Perfect scores in sports
Lists of snooker players

fr:Break (snooker)#Break maximum
pl:Break snookerowy#Breaki maksymalne
pt:Break (snooker)#Break máximo